This is the list of cathedrals in the Czech Republic sorted by denomination.

Catholic

Latin Church
The following are Latin Church cathedrals and co-cathedrals of the Catholic Church in the Czech Republic:

Ecclesiastical province of Bohemia
 St. Vitus Cathedral in Prague (Archdiocese of Prague)
 St. Nicholas Cathedral in České Budějovice (Diocese of České Budějovice)
 Cathedral of the Holy Spirit in Hradec Králové (Diocese of Hradec Králové)
 St. Stephen's Cathedral in Litoměřice (Diocese of Litoměřice)
 St. Bartholomew's Cathedral in Plzeň (Diocese of Plzeň)
Ecclesiastical province of Moravia
 Saint Wenceslas Cathedral in Olomouc (Archdiocese of Olomouc)
 Cathedral of St. Peter and St. Paul in Brno (Diocese of Brno)
 Cathedral of the Divine Saviour in Ostrava (Diocese of Ostrava-Opava)
 Co-Cathedral of Our Lady of the Assumption in Opava

Ruthenian Greek Catholic Church
The following cathedral of the Ruthenian Greek Catholic Church is located in the Czech Republic:
 St. Clement's Cathedral, Prague (Apostolic Exarchate in the Czech Republic)

Old Catholic
The following Old Catholic cathedrals are located in the Czech Republic:
 Cathedral of Saint Lawrence in Prague
 Co-Cathedral of the Transfiguration in Varnsdorf

Eastern Orthodox
The following cathedrals of the Czech and Slovak Orthodox Church cathedrals are located in the Czech Republic:
 Ss. Cyril and Methodius Cathedral in Prague
 Cathedral of St. Gorazd in Olomouc

Note
The list above does not include St. Barbara Church in Kutná Hora, which, despite being often called a cathedral due to its size and elaborate Gothic architecture, never served as episcopal see.

See also
 Lists of cathedrals

References

Czech Republic
Cathedral
Cathedrals